is a Japanese manga series written and illustrated by Yumiko Ōshima. It was serialized by Hakusensha in LaLa magazine from 1978 to 1987 and collected in seven tankōbon volumes. The story is about an abandoned kitten called Chibi-neko (drawn as a small girl with cat ears and tail) who is adopted by a young man named Tokio who grows up believing that she is human.

The series was adapted as an anime movie directed by Shinichi Tsuji and produced by Mushi Production, it was released in theaters in February 1984.

In 1979, Wata no Kunihoshi received the 3rd Kodansha Manga Award for the shōjo category. It is credited with popularizing the kemonomimi (catgirl) character type.

Synopsis
A two-month-old kitten, was abandoned by her owners. An 18-year-old young man named Tokio finds Chibi-nekko and brings her home. Although his mother is allergic to cats and fears them, she agrees to let him keep the kitten for company because she is afraid that he has become too withdrawn after having failed his university entrance exams.

Soon, Chibi-nekko falls in love with Tokio. In her own mind, Chibi-nekko is a young human who speaks the human language, even though people only seem to hear her cat meows. She believes that all humans were once kittens like her. When she realizes that Tokio is in love with a human girl, Chibi-nekko wishes to grow up quickly into a young woman. A tomcat, Raphael, tells Chibi-nekko that it would be impossible for her to do so, shattering her dream. Raphael proceeds to tell Chibi-nekko of a paradise called Cottonland, where dreams can come true. Chibi-nekko runs away from home to travel with Raphael in search of Cottonland. After many adventures, she ends up near Tokio's house, where his mother finds her and overcomes her fear of cats.

Characters
 
 
She was an abandoned cat before being adopted by Tokio. She believes that there is a way that cats can become human.
 
 
 18 years old. Has recently failed his college entrance exams after encountering a kitten.
 
 
 Tokio's father and a novelist.
 
 
 Tokio's mother and a stay-at-home mom. She is allergic to cats and was afraid of them before she met Chibi.
 
 
 Tokio's girlfriend and a law school student.
 
 
 Beautiful male leader of the neighborhood cats. He admires Chibi.
 
 
 Chibi-neko's friend. He has a little sister who looks like Chibi-neko.
 
 Appears in the "Cat" Chibi sequel.

Media

Manga
Wata no Kunihoshi was serialized by Hakusensha in LaLa magazine at irregular intervals from 1978 to 1987. The series was collected in seven tankōbon volumes under the Hana to Yume imprint, and then reissued in 16 child-sized volumes. It was later reprinted in four bunkoban volumes on June 17, 1994.

Original release
 June 20, 1978, 
 June 20, 1979, 
 April 25, 1980, 
 March 25, 1981, 
 December 25, 1983, 
 March 25, 1985, 
 August 25, 1986,

Reprint
The manga was reprinted in bunkoban format on June 17, 1994.

Film comics
The film was adapted by Futabasha in March 1984 into a three-part manga using images from the film.
 綿の国星Part 1
 綿の国星Part 2
 綿の国星Part 3

Other books
All books by Ōshima unless otherwise noted. Listed in release order.
 – Hardcover. Released by Hakusensha in May 1980. No ISBN.
 – Released by Hakusensha in December 1980. . No ISBN.
 – Mook related to the film. Released by Animedia through Gakken in March 1984. No ISBN.
 – Sheet music book.
 – Picture book sequel to the manga. Released by Shogakukan in November 1995. .
Reprint:  – Released in bunkoban and ebook formats by Hakusensha in November 2010. .
Volumes 9, 15, and 16 of  – This 10-volume set contains selections from Ōshima's works. Volumes 9, 15, and 16 contain excerpts from this series. Released by Asahi Sonorama in August 2003. .
 – Cookbook based on the manga, with many new illustrations and many from the manga. Co-written with Minako Imada, an expert on Western foods and table arrangements (for photos). Released by Fukkan in February 2014. .

Movie
Wata no Kunihoshi was adapted as an anime movie that was produced by Mushi Production. The movie was directed by Shinichi Tsuji from a script by Masaki Tsuji and Yumiko Ōshima, with music by pianist Richard Clayderman. The movie was released in theaters on February 11, 1984. The movie was later released on VHS, and VHD by Victor Japan. It was released on DVD by Columbia Music Entertainment on March 31, 2004.

Albums
The opening theme song for the film was by Richard Clayderman, titled . Two albums, a soundtrack and an image album, and a single were released. 
 – Released as an LP by Victor Japan. VIP-20875.
 – Released as an LP by Victor Japan. JBX-25030.
 – Single EP (12-inch). Released by Victor in 1980. KVX-1073.

Reception
Wata no Kunihoshi won the 3rd Kodansha Manga Award in the shōjo category in 1979. The same year, it was voted the most popular series running in LaLa magazine. According to German manga scholar Jaqueline Berndt, the depiction of cats as young girls spread to other manga series from Wata no Kunihoshi. It is described by Masanao Amano as not just a simple animal fable but a story in which psychological and mental states are highly differentiated.

The movie of Wata no Kunihoshi has been praised as a "hidden gem" for its complex characterization, philosophical story, and gorgeous animation. The soundtrack of Richard Clayderman's piano music is praised by Helen McCarthy and Jonathan Clements as striking exactly the right tone for the romantic mood. The depiction of Chibi-neko's self-image as a catgirl was seen by a reviewer at THEM Anime Reviews as a metaphor for adolescence.

References

External links

 Official Columbia movie website 
 

1978 manga
1984 anime films
Manga series
Animated films based on manga
Hakusensha franchises
Hakusensha manga
Japanese animated films
Japanese-language films
Manga adapted into films
Shōjo manga
Winner of Kodansha Manga Award (Shōjo)